Swimming at the 2017 World Aquatics Championships was held from 23 to 30 July 2017 in Budapest, Hungary.

Schedule 
42 events were held.

All times are local (UTC+2).

M = Morning session (starting at 09:30), E = Evening session (starting at 17:30)

Medal summary

Medal table 

 Host nation

Men 

 Swimmers who participated in the heats only and received medals.

Women 

 Swimmers who participated in the heats only and received medals.

Mixed 

 Swimmers who participated in the heats only and received medals.

Records 
The following world, championship, and area records were broken during the competition.

World records

Championship records

National records

References

External links 
 Official website

 
Swimming
Swimming at the World Aquatics Championships
World Aquatics Championships